Minus V is an instrumental collection by Do As Infinity released after its disbanding. It was released among five other different Do As Infinity items on the same day. This CD consists of mostly previously unreleased instrumental versions of Do As Infinity's songs. The "V" in name of the album is speculated to be the short for Tomiko Van, the lead singer of the band, or vocal because there aren't any of Tomiko Van's vocals in the CD.

Track listing
 "Yesterday & Today" – 5:04
 "Break of Dawn" – 3:07
 "Welcome!" – 3:42
  – 4:04
  – 4:17
  – 4:55
 "Grateful Journey" – 4:18
  – 4:31
  – 5:08
 "Gates of Heaven" – 4:09
  – 5:05
 "Thanksgiving Day" – 3:39
 "Robot" – 3:30
 "Need Your Love" – 4:48
  – 3:29
 "I Miss You?" – 3:48
  – 3:41

Chart positions

External links
 Minus V (instrumental collection) at Avex Network
 Minus V (instrumental collection) at Oricon

Do As Infinity albums
2006 compilation albums
Avex Group compilation albums
Albums produced by Seiji Kameda